Justice League: War is a 2014 American animated superhero film featuring the DC Comics superhero team the Justice League, and an adaptation of the story Justice League: Origin by Geoff Johns and Jim Lee, the first story in DC's 2011 DC Universe relaunch. It was directed by Jay Oliva, scripted by Heath Corson. It is the 18th film of the DC Universe Animated Original Movies and the second film in the DC Animated Movie Universe. The film was released for downloading on January 21, 2014 and was released on Blu-ray and DVD formats on February 4. It had its world premiere at the Paley Center for Media on the same day. Warner Home Video re-released the film on a combo pack in August 2015, which includes a DVD and Blu-Ray copy, a digital copy, and the graphic novel it is based on. The film depicts an invasion of Earth by the alien and demon "New God", Darkseid, and the subsequent formation of the titular superhero team to counter it, which includes Superman, Batman, Wonder Woman, Flash, Green Lantern, Cyborg and Shazam. A stand-alone sequel, Justice League: Throne of Atlantis, was released in January 2015. The film also begins a story-arc which is revisited in Reign of the Supermen and concludes in Justice League Dark: Apokolips War.

Plot
 
A series of abductions have occurred in Gotham City; Batman is implicated due to video footage. Green Lantern stops a kidnapping before attacking the kidnapper, a Parademon, and is almost defeated when Batman appears. The Parademon attacks them both; Batman and Green Lantern chase it into the sewers, where it charges a Mother Box and explodes. They examine the box, deduce it is of extraterrestrial origin, and decide to ask Superman for an answer. Another Mother Box, supplied by Flash is being studied at S.T.A.R. Labs by Silas Stone, father of Victor Stone.

Superman, who fought with a Parademon previously and believes Batman and Green Lantern are working with it, fights the both of them; the two are hopelessly outmatched, with the battle only stopping when Batman calls him "Clark" and Superman discovers Batman is Bruce Wayne. The trio begin to work together against the Parademons. On the planet Apokolips, Darkseid orders Desaad to begin an invasion of Earth in response to the superheroes' discovery of his plans. Victor and Silas argue over Silas' belief that metahumans are more important than football. Superman, Batman and Green Lantern realize an invasion has begun when the box activates and several Boom Tubes appear throughout the world.

The Box in S.T.A.R. Labs explodes and creates a Boom Tube when Victor is holding it. The explosion fuses the technology inside the Box to Victor's wounded, mutilated body. As several Parademons attack, Silas takes Victor to a technologically advanced medical bed and uses experimental technologies on him. Countless Parademons appear and attack around the world. The Box's technology spliced with Victor's body fuses itself with the various technologies around the room. Victor is transformed into Cyborg, with a body capable of transforming and adapting itself, including obtaining new features. Just as the Flash saves the scientists, Cyborg discovers details of Apokolips, Darkseid, and the invasion plan. He learns that the Parademons are actually inhabitants of worlds conquered by Darkseid, spliced with his technology, allowing him to mind-control them into serving as an army for conquering other planets. Billy Batson sees a Parademon outside and mystically turns into the superhero Shazam. Air Force One is attacked in the air, but is saved by the Amazon princess Wonder Woman and Superman. After the heroes gather, Cyborg reveals that the invasion is a prelude to the terraforming of Earth. Darkseid arrives and proves to be an extremely powerful opponent and the entire Justice League is hopelessly outmatched.

Darkseid uses his Omega Beams to fight Flash and Superman, who is incapacitated and captured by a Parademon. Batman prevents Green Lantern from going after them on his own with a broken arm. He tells Green Lantern to think about the lives at stake rather than his own image as a hero, and after unmasking himself, reveals that his parents' murders are what motivated him to fight evil. Bruce allows himself to be captured to save Superman. Green Lantern has the idea to strip Darkseid of his Omega Beams by destroying his eyes. Bruce goes through a portal to Apokolips, where he escapes the Parademon and stops DeSaad from turning Superman into a Parademon. Superman is left unstable and highly aggressive because of the brainwashing process, resulting in him strangling DeSaad to death and attacking Parademons and Batman. Batman reasons with him, and helps him reassert his own personality. On Earth, after Darkseid's eyes are destroyed by the Justice League, Cyborg reopens the Boom Tubes to send Darkseid and his army back to Apokolips. Darkseid fights back, and with Superman and Batman's assistance, the group eventually force him through the portal. With the world saved, the superheroes gain the public's trust and are honored at the White House.

In a post-credits scene, an Atlantean ship emerges from the ocean and Ocean Master appears carrying the dead body of his king. He believes that the surface dwellers on Earth are responsible, calling it an act of war from the surface, for which he swears revenge.

Voice cast

Music

The soundtrack to Justice League: War was released on February 4, 2014. The music was composed by Kevin Kliesch.

Track list

Reception

Critical reception
IGN gave a total score of 8.8/10, calling it a "great modern origin story that will win you over with its action and humor". CraveOnline gave it a rating of 9.0/10.

Conversely, Brian Lowry of Variety believes it did not reach the high standards of other DC Animated Movies; he wrote that "the interplay yields its share of moments but ultimately proves too frenzied and chaotic to deliver more than a few revisionist thrills". Additionally, Scott Mendelson of Forbes' Magazine called the film a "dry run for Justice League". He criticized the plot, describing it as "monotonous".

Sales
It earned $5,789,529 from domestic home video sales.

Sequels

A follow-up, Justice League: Throne of Atlantis featuring Matt Lanter as Aquaman / Arthur Curry, was released in January 2015 with several of the first film's cast reprising their roles; notable changes include Alan Tudyk, Michelle Monaghan, and Justin Kirk, who were replaced by Jerry O'Connell, Rosario Dawson, and Nathan Fillion in the roles of Superman / Clark Kent, Wonder Woman / Diana Prince, and Green Lantern / Hal Jordan, respectively. A third sequel titled Justice League vs. Teen Titans was released in 2016 which introduced the Teen Titans into the DCAMU and featured them fighting the League, with the latter under control of the demon Trigon.

Notes

References

External links

 

2010s American animated films
2014 animated films
2014 direct-to-video films
2014 films
2010s direct-to-video animated superhero films
2010s animated superhero films
Alien invasions in films
Animated Justice League films
DC Animated Movie Universe
2010s English-language films
Films based on works by Geoff Johns
Films directed by Jay Oliva
Animated superhero films
Animated science fiction films
2010s science fiction films
Films set in 2014